J. Fletcher Hopkins (died August 29, 1953) was an American politician from Maryland. He served as a member of the Maryland House of Delegates, representing Harford County, from 1920 to 1922.

Early life
John Fletcher Hopkins was from Darlington, Maryland.

Career
Hopkins was a Democrat. He served as a member of the Maryland House of Delegates, representing Harford County, from 1920 to 1922.

Personal life
Hopkins married Ella Hollis on August 27, 1907, in Aberdeen, Maryland. His wife died in 1948.

Hopkins died on August 29, 1953. He was buried at Darlington Cemetery.

References

Year of birth missing
Place of birth missing
1953 deaths
People from Darlington, Maryland
Democratic Party members of the Maryland House of Delegates